George M. Thomas may refer to:
 George M. Thomas (American politician)
 George M. Thomas (Indian politician)